Babol County is in Mazandaran province, Iran. The capital of the county is the city of Babol. At the 2006 census, the county's population was 464,538 in 125,187 households. The following census in 2011 counted 495,472 people in 149,320 households. At the 2016 census, the county's population was 531,930 in 174,351 households.

The name of Babol county was Barforush in the 19th century.

The most famous of Babol's historical buildings are Imamzadeh Ghasem (a holy shrine built at 15 AD), Ganjineh-ye-Babol, Mohammad Hassan Khan bridge, tower of the Royal Palace and the Jameh Mosque.

Some notable families originating from Mazandaran, specifically Babol County, are:
House of Pahlavi 
House of Karen
House of Moradi (branch of the House of Suren)
House of Suren
House of Batoul

The largest heritage of Babol, as well as the Mazandaran region are the Balf.

Administrative divisions

The population history of Babol County's administrative divisions over three consecutive censuses is shown in the following table. The latest census shows six districts, 13 rural districts, and seven cities.

References

 اطلس گیتاشناسی استان‌های ایران [Atlas Gitashenasi Ostanhai Iran] (Gitashenasi Province Atlas of Iran)
 Babol.tk [Babol.tk]

 

Counties of Mazandaran Province